The Amuyao tree-mouse (Musseromys inopinatus) is a species of rodent in the family Muridae. It is found on Mount Amuyao in Luzon, Philippines.

Description 

As for all members of the genus Musseromys, they are small murids weighing between 15 and 22 grams. They have tails (82 - 101 mm) usually longer than the rest of their bodies (74 - 84 mm).

Two adult specimens were collected, now in the collections of the Field Museum of Natural History (FMNH): 
 an adult male (♂) (FMNH 193839, holotype)
 an adult female (♀) (FMNH 193840).

Their measurements are as follows :

Conservation 

Data on this species endemic to the Philippines is, as of now, known from only one location. This particularity, alongside a lack of knowledge on the repartition and abundance of the species, brought the IUCN to assess the Amuyao tree-mouse as "Data Deficient".

References

Musseromys
Mammals described in 2014
Mammals of the Philippines
Endemic fauna of the Philippines